Alex Jens Kenneth Mortensen (born 13 July 2002) is a Swedish professional footballer who plays as a forward. He is under contract with the Dutch Eredivisie club Groningen.

Club career
A youth product of Kalmar, Mortenssen made his professional debut with them in a 4–1 Svenska Cupen win over Asarums on 20 October 2020. He signed his first professional contract with Kalmar on 20 December 2020.

On 2 July 2021, he joined the Eredivisie club Groningen on loan for the 2021–22 season, with an option to buy. He debuted with Groningen in the Eredisivie in a 1–1 tie with Twente on 1 October 2021, coming on as a late sub in the 94th minute. The deal became permanent on 15 May 2022, with Mortensen signing a two-year contract.

Just five days later, Groningen announced that Mortensen suffered a serious knee injury and will not be able to play for an extended period of time.

Personal life
In December 2020, on the way home from training Mortensen saw a man about to climb off the E22 in Sweden attempting to commit suicide. Mortensen, then 18 years old, prevented the man from jumping and got a bystander to call a police, and resolve the issue.

References

External links
 
 Eredivisie profile
 Svenskfotboll profile

2002 births
Living people
Swedish footballers
Association football forwards
Kalmar FF players
FC Groningen players
Eredivisie players
Swedish expatriate footballers
Swedish expatriate sportspeople in the Netherlands
Expatriate footballers in the Netherlands